William Smith (born 6 December 1943) is a Scottish retired professional football wing half who played in the Football League for Brentford.

Career

Early years 
Born in Glasgow, Smith began his career as an inside left with junior club Blantyre Celtic before securing a move to Scottish League First Division club Celtic in 1960. He failed to appear for the first team and departed Celtic Park in 1963.

Brentford 
Smith moved to England to sign for Third Division club Brentford on a free transfer in June 1963. Playing as a wing half, Smith made something of a breakthrough into the first team during the 1963–64 season and made 18 appearances. Over the course of the following two seasons, Smith lost his place to Mel Scott and made just 12 appearances. He was mostly confined to the reserves and won the London Challenge Cup with the team in 1965. Smith departed Griffin Park at the end of the 1965–66 and made 30 appearances for the club.

Hastings United 
After his release from Brentford, Smith dropped into non-league football and signed for Southern League First Division club Hastings United during the 1966 off-season. He helped the club to a second-place finish in the 1966–67 season, which secured promotion to the Premier Division.

Honours 
Brentford Reserves
 London Challenge Cup: 1964–65

Career statistics

References

1943 births
Footballers from Glasgow
Scottish footballers
Association football inside forwards
Brentford F.C. players
Blantyre Celtic F.C. players
English Football League players
Celtic F.C. players
Hastings United F.C. (1948) players
Southern Football League players
Association football wing halves
Living people
Scottish Junior Football Association players